In the United States the Associate Director of National Intelligence and Chief Information Officer (Intelligence Community CIO, ADNI/CIO or IC CIO) is charged with directing and managing activities relating to information technology for the Intelligence Community (IC) and the Office of the Director of National Intelligence (ODNI). The IC CIO reports directly to the Director of National Intelligence (DNI). As of January 20, 2021 Michael Waschull has been named as Acting IC Chief Information Officer.

Mission
The IC CIO has four primary areas of responsibility:
Manage activities relating to the information technology infrastructure and enterprise architecture of the Intelligence Community;
Exercise procurement approval authority over all information technology items related to the enterprise architecture of all Intelligence Community components;
Direct and manage all information technology-related procurement for the Intelligence Community; and
Ensure all expenditures for information technology and research and development activities are consistent with the Intelligence Community enterprise architecture and the strategy of the Director for such architecture.

History
The Office of the IC CIO was established by Intelligence Community Directive (ICD) 500, "Director of National Intelligence Chief Information Officer," effective August 7, 2008. ICD 500 superseded Director of Central Intelligence Directive (DCID) 1/6, "The Intelligence Community Chief Information Officer."

List of Associate Directors of National Intelligence and Chief Information Officers
Dale Meyerrose December 21, 2005 – September 2008
Patrick Gorman (acting) October 2008 – January 20, 2009
Priscilla Guthrie May 26, 2009 – November 19, 2010
Charlene Leubecker (acting) November 19, 2010 – ?
Al Tarasiuk February 2011 – April 28, 2015
Dr. Raymond "Ray" Cook July 23, 2015 – January 20, 2017
Jennifer Kron (acting)  January 20, 2017 – September 11, 2017
John Sherman September 11, 2017 – January 20, 2021
Michael Waschull (acting) January 20, 2021 – January 23, 2022
Dr. Adele J. Merritt January 24, 2022 – present

References

External links
CIA CIO To Head IT For Intelligence Community
Intelligence Community Directive 500: Director of National Intelligence Chief Information Officer
Office of the Director of National Intelligence
US Intelligence Community
An Overview of the United States Intelligence Community

United States intelligence agencies